Mylia is a genus of liverworts. It is the only genus in the family Myliaceae. While many species are green, some species may be brownish to reddish.  The leaves are unlobed and have a smooth edge; the underleaves are tapered and narrow.  Plants may have gemmae.

The species of this genus are found in Northern Hemisphere.

Species:

Mylia aequata 
Mylia anomala 
Mylia fragilis 
Mylia iversenii 
Mylia taylorii 
Mylia verrucosa 
Mylia vietnamica

References

Jungermanniales
Jungermanniales genera